Argentville is an unincorporated community in Lincoln County, in the U.S. state of Missouri.

History
A post office called Argentville was established in 1879, and remained in operation until 1907. The community has the name of Raleigh Argent, an early settler.

In 1925, Argentville had 32 inhabitants.

References

Unincorporated communities in Lincoln County, Missouri
Unincorporated communities in Missouri